William Edmunds may refer to: 
William Edmunds (architect) (1801–1847), English architect
William P. Edmunds (1885–1977), West Virginia University Mountaineers 14th head college football coach
William Edmunds (actor) (1886–1981), stage and screen character actor
Wil Edmunds (William Glyndwr Edmunds, born 1947), Welsh educationalist
Bill Edmunds (1898–1964), English footballer

See also
William Edmonds (disambiguation)